Johnny Robinson may refer to:

Johnny Robinson (defensive tackle) (born 1959), former defensive tackle for the Oakland Raiders
Johnny Robinson (footballer) (1936–2019), English footballer
Johnny Leartice Robinson (1952–2004), convicted murderer
Johnny Robinson (safety) (born 1938), former safety for the Kansas City Chiefs
Johnny Robinson (singer), British singer and contestant on The X Factor in 2011
The shooting of Johnny Robinson, a sixteen-year-old black youth that was shot to death in 1963

See also
John Robinson (disambiguation)